The 2016–17 Wichita State Shockers men's basketball team represented Wichita State University in the 2016–17 NCAA Division I men's basketball season. They played their home games at the Charles Koch Arena in Wichita, Kansas and were led by 10th-year head coach Gregg Marshall. They were members of the Missouri Valley Conference. They finished the season 31–5, 17–1 to finish in a tie for first place in MVC play. In the MVC tournament, they beat Bradley, Missouri State, and Illinois State to win the tournament championship. As a result, they earned the conference's automatic bid to the NCAA tournament. As the No. 10 seed in the South region, they defeated Dayton in the first round before losing to No. 2-seeded Kentucky in the second round.

This was the Shockers' final season as a member of the Missouri Valley Conference, as the school announced on April 7, 2017 that it would be joining the American Athletic Conference effective July 1, 2017.

Previous season
The Shockers finished the 2015–16 season with a record 26–9, 16–2 in Missouri Valley play to win the MVC regular season championship. They lost in the semifinals of the MVC tournament to Northern Iowa. The Shockers received an at-large bid to the NCAA tournament as a No. 11 seed. They defeated Vanderbilt in the First Four and Arizona in the first round before losing to Miami (FL) in the second round.

Offseason

Departures

Class of 2016 recruits

Preseason
The Shockers were picked, for the fourth consecutive year, to win the Missouri Valley Conference by an MVC preseason poll. Markis McDuffie, the 2016 MVC Freshman of the Year, was selected to the conference's preseason All-MVC team.

Roster

Schedule and results

|-
!colspan=12 style=| Exhibition

|-
!colspan=12 style=| Non-conference regular season

|-
!colspan=12 style=| Missouri Valley regular season

|-
!colspan=12 style=| Missouri Valley tournament

|-
!colspan=12 style=| NCAA tournament

Rankings

*AP does not release post-NCAA tournament rankings

References

Wichita State Shockers men's basketball seasons
Wichita State
Wichita State
Shock
Shock